Caldecote is a common place name and means "cold cottage".

In the United Kingdom:
 Caldecote, Buckinghamshire
 Caldecote, Huntingdonshire, Cambridgeshire
 Caldecote, South Cambridgeshire, Cambridgeshire
 Caldecote, Hertfordshire
 Caldecote, Norfolk, formerly in Swaffham Rural District
 Caldecote, Northamptonshire
 Caldecote, Warwickshire
 Chalk Farm, London, originally known as Caldecote or Chaldecote

See also 
 Caldecott (disambiguation)
 Caldecotte, a district in the parish of Walton, Milton Keynes, in ceremonial Buckinghamshire, England
 Caldecote, Bedfordshire (disambiguation), a pair of hamlets in Bedfordshire, England
 Caldicot (disambiguation)